This article lists the monarchs (Ngwenyamas) of Eswatini (known as Swaziland for most of its history). 

The King of Eswatini (also known as Ingwenyama) rules alongside the Queen Mother (also known as Ndlovukati). The role of the king has historically been as the head or father of the nation while the Queen Mother is the spiritual leader of the nation.

Ancient Kings / Chiefs of the Swazi people (pre–1745)
 Mkhulunkosi
 Qomizitha
 Sukuta
 Madlasomo
 Ndlovu
 Ngwekati
 Mawawa
 Sidvwabasilutfuli
 Sukumbili
 Mbokane
 Gebase
 Kunene
 Nkabingwe
 Madlabane
 Hhili
 Dulunga
 Dondobola
 Sihuba
 Mlangeni
 Msimudze
 Mbhondlo
 Tembe
 Sikhulumaloyo
 Langa Samuketi
 Nkomo: 1200–1300
 Khabako: 1300–1355
 Nkosi I: 1355–1400
 Ngwane I: 1400–1435
 Dlamini I (Matalatala): 1435–1465
 Mswati I: 1480–1520
 Ngwane II: 1520–1550
 Dlamini II: 1555–1600
 Nkosi II: 1600–1640
 Mavuso I: 1645–1680
 Magudulela: 1685–1685
 Ludvonga I: 1685–1715
 Dlamini III: 1720–1744

Kings of Swaziland (1745–1906)
 Ngwane III: 1745–1780 (The first King of modern Swaziland)
 LaYaka Ndwandwe (Queen Regent): 1780
 Ndvungunye (Zikodze, Mavuso II): 1780–1815
 Lomvula Mndzebele (Queen Regent): 1815
 Sobhuza I (Somhlolo, also known as Ngwane IV): 1815–1839
 Lojiba Simelane (Queen Regent): 1836–1840
 Mswati II (Mavuso III): 1840–1865
 Tsandzile Ndwandwe (Queen Regent): August 1865 – June 1875
 Crown Prince Ludvonga II (Macaleni) – Never became King
 Dlamini IV (Mbandzeni): 1875–1889
 Tibati Nkambule (Queen Regent): 7 April 1889 – 1894
 Ngwane V (Mahlokohla): January 1895 – 10 December 1899
 Labotsibeni Gwamile Mdluli (Queen Regent): 10 December 1899 – 31 March 1906
 Sobhuza II: 10 December 1899 - 31 March 1906

Paramount Chiefs of the Swaziland Protectorate (1906–1968)

 Labotsibeni Gwamile Mdluli (Queen Regent): 31 March 1906 – 22 December 1921
 Sobhuza II: 22 December 1921 – 2 September 1968

Kings of Swaziland / Eswatini (1968–present)

"Authorized Person" during the minority of King Mswati III
Prince Sozisa Dlamini: 21 August 1982 – 1 November 1985 

Regents during the minority of King Mswati III
Queen Dzeliwe: 21 August 1982 – 9 August 1983
Prince Sozisa Dlamini: 9 August 1983 – 18 August 1983 
Queen Ntfombi: 18 August 1983 – 25 April 1986

Timeline since 1921

Royal Standard

See also
 Succession to the Swazi throne
 List of prime ministers of Eswatini
 Lists of office-holders

References

External links
 Rulers: Eswatini
 Swaziland Royal Family Tree
 Swaziland Nation Trust Commission: Swazi History
 Official Website of Swaziland Monarchy
 Swaziland government site: Kings of the Kingdom

Eswatini

Eswatini